Aaron Matthew Laing (born July 19, 1971) is a former American football tight end in the National Football League who played for the San Diego Chargers and St. Louis Rams. He played college football for the Lamar Cardinals and New Mexico State Aggies.

References

1971 births
Living people
American football tight ends
San Diego Chargers players
St. Louis Rams players
Lamar Cardinals football players
New Mexico State Aggies football players